= Chris L Jenkins =

American independent filmmaker and journalist

Chris L. Jenkins
- Born: March 2, 1971 (age 55)
- Citizenship: United States of America
- Education: Oberlin College, University of California, Berkeley, University of Southern California
- Occupations: Filmmaker, Journalist
- Years active: 1996–present
- Website: www.chrisljenkins.com

Chris L Jenkins (born March 2, 1971) is an American independent filmmaker and journalist. He is best known for his award-winning documentary Trapped: Cash Bail in America, Rikers: Innocence Lost, BrotherSpeak, and MEN: The Dreamer.

== Early life and education ==
Jenkins graduated from Oberlin College, where he pursued a bachelor's degree in History in 1993. After that, he served as director of a foster care program in the Bronx, New York, and also worked as a social justice activist in Harlem.

In 1998, Jenkins pursued a master's degree program in Journalism at the University of California, Berkeley. Jenkins also received a master's in Specialized Journalism from the University of Southern California in 2010.

== Filmography ==
S.No.	Title	Genre	Credits	Year
1	BrotherSpeak	Short Documentary	Writer, Executive Producer	2014
2	MEN: The Dreamer	Short Documentary	Executive Producer	2017
3	The Moodys	Short Documentary	Executive Producer	2017
4	Rikers: Innocence Lost	Short Documentary	Writer, Producer	2018
5	Trapped: Cash Bail in America	Documentary	Writer, Producer	2020
6	Mavericks	Documentary Series	Writer, Executive Producer	2021

== Awards ==
- 2013- First Place in Business Reporting, MDDC Press Association
- 2008- Pulitzer Prize for Breaking News as one of The Washington Post Staff
- 2014- Best Digital Storytelling award by National Association of Black Journalist
- Diversity in Storytelling Award at SeriesFest Film Festival

== Personal life ==
Jenkins married Sara Collins in 2019. She is an interventional cardiologist.
